is a 2016 Japanese family drama film edited, written, and directed by Hirokazu Kore-eda. It was screened in the Un Certain Regard section at the 2016 Cannes Film Festival and was released in Japan on May 21, 2016. The film received acclaim from critics.

Plot
Dwelling on his past glory as a minor prize-winning author from a single novel, Ryota (Hiroshi Abe) wastes any money he makes as a private detective on gambling and can barely make ends meet or pay child support for his son. He makes extra money by offering his own services to the detective agency's clients or blackmailing them. Though he is offered a contract to write for a manga series with an upcoming artist, his personal pride prevents him.

After the death of his father, his aging mother Yoshiko (Kirin Kiki) seems to be moving on with her life with hobbies with the local elderly ladies. Ryota finds his sister Chinatsu is visiting their mother frequently and suspects she is trying to sponge off her; he later learns their mother is to fund his sister's daughter's new figure skating lessons from her social pension. His sister in turn suspects Ryota's visits are for getting money from their mother and recounts an old hiding place where their mother successfully hid money from their gambler father. When Ryota checks it later he is pleased to find what he thinks is cash, only to unwrap cardboard and a note to him from his sister.

Ryota is trying to get back with his ex-wife Kyoko (Yoko Maki), who has grown tired of Ryota's excuses for his continual failure to pay child support, and threatens to stop letting him spend time with their young son, Shingo (Taiyo Yoshizawa).  Ryota is aware that Kyoko has a new boyfriend and fears her remarriage would end his relationship with Shingo.  During a stormy summer night, sheltering from the typhoon with his family at his mother's home, his ex-wife says it is truly over with them and grown-ups cannot live only with love; planning is required as well and Ryota isn't cut out to be a family man – if he were, he would have behaved as one earlier. Ryota understands and attempts to take back control of his existence and to find a lasting place in Shingo's life. He uses the storm as a chance to bond with his son by repeating a memorable experience he once had with his father, sheltering in a local playground as the storm rages.

The next morning, they resume their lives.

Cast
Hiroshi Abe as Ryota Shinoda
Yōko Maki as Kyoko Shiraishi
Taiyō Yoshizawa as Shingo Shiraishi
Kirin Kiki as Yoshiko Shinoda
Satomi Kobayashi as Chinatsu Shinoda
Sosuke Ikematsu
Kazuya Takahashi
Aju Makita
Lily Franky
Isao Hashizume

Production
Kore-eda conceived of the film in 2001 when he visited his mother, who had been living alone in a housing complex after his father's death. He started writing the screenplay in the summer of 2013. Filming began in May 2014 and lasted a month and a half, in between the production of Our Little Sister, which was shot throughout a year.

Reception

Box office
On its opening weekend at the Japanese box office, After the Storm was placed fifth, with 89,510 admissions.

Critical response
The site's critical consensus reads, "After the Storm crosses cultural lines to offer timeless observations about parental responsibilities, personal bonds, and the capacity for forgiveness." It also holds an 84/100 on Metacritic. Calling the film "a classic Japanese family drama of gentle persuasion and staggering simplicity", which is "beautifully balanced between gentle comedy and the melancholy reality of how people really are," Deborah Young of The Hollywood Reporter suggests the film is about how "you can’t always have the life you want, or be who you want to be".

Accolades

References

External links
 
Film Movement official site

2016 films
2016 drama films
Films directed by Hirokazu Kore-eda
Japanese drama films
2010s Japanese films
2010s Japanese-language films